Pseudoricia flavizoma is a moth of the family Notodontidae. It is found in wet forest areas at elevations ranging between 200 and 1,100 meters in Costa Rica. It has also been recorded from Panama.

The length of the forewings is 14-15.5 mm for males. The ground color of the forewings is olive gray in outer half (slightly darker at the margins) and lighter olive gray in the basal half. The ground color of the hindwings is yellow-orange.

Etymology
The name combines flavus, which is Latin for yellow and Greek zoma (meaning girdled or belted) and refers to the unique orange-yellow and gray bands on the abdomen.

References

Moths described in 2008
Notodontidae